

Overview 
A development director or director of development is the senior fundraising manager of a non-profit organization, company, or corporation. The position works closely with a chief financial officer (CFO) or treasurer. A director of development is chiefly responsible for bringing in revenue streams to a non-profit (grants, donations, special events), and a CFO is responsible for the fiscal management of the organization. A CFO is rarely assigned to write grant narratives, but may oversee the budget section of a grant application or a fiscal report for a grant. Some larger organizations (especially those that have large government grants) have a grants manager as well as a grant writer/director of development.  A grants manager assists the CFO with grant reports and grant-related accounting. A development director is usually remunerated for his or her work, and in best practices for nonprofit organizations, development directors earn salaries.  Commissions are still considered unethical by professional organizations such as the Grant Professionals Association (GPA) and the Association of Fundraising Professionals (AFP), but the practice of commission-based remuneration depends on the state of the economy.

Responsibilities 
The role of a development director is to develop and implement a strategic plan to raise vital funds for their organization in a cost-effective and time-efficient manner. The development director's primary responsibility, however, is to oversee fundraising, rather than to actually raise money. This person may write grants, research foundations and corporations, and oversee or implement other fundraising strategies, but she or he works mostly behind the scenes, establishing a structure for effective fundraising. The development director may also be responsible for additional financial responsibilities, including developing business plans or strategic plans in collaboration with the board for the future of the organization. The development director is usually accountable to the executive director, chief operating officer, or CFO. The board often offers suggestions and ideas about how to increase the fundraising, including contacts, and the development director chooses how to implement these ideas to maximize inflow while keeping outflow at a minimum and keeping donors happy. A strong board often has a development/fundraising committee, makes personal donations to the non-profit, and assists with annual campaigns.

The development director has an outreach role in the organization and often fulfills a public affairs role in addition to office-based work. Development directors motivate and satisfy donors, board members, staff and even the press. Many directors of development assist with communications such a non-profits annual report, development and communications section of website, newsletters, and donor databases.

The structure of a development department varies greatly. A director of development may or may not have staff reporting to him or her, depending on the size of the organization. Some large non-profits have a development team including a grant writer, donor database specialist, grants manager, special events coordinator, communications staff, and planning giving staff. In some cases, an executive director serves as the lead grant writer of an organization. Some non-profits hire development staff on a part-time or consultant basis, instead of full-time.

Compensation 
Median pay for development directors in the U.S. is around $62,000 annually. Total cash compensation ranges from $40,000 to $100,000; the final number includes potential for approximately $10,000 each from bonus and profit sharing in exceptional cases. While geography and years of experience impact pay for this group, the organization is the most influential factor. Earnings for this group are mostly affected by the particular organization, followed by the particular city and tenure.

Summary 
As the title suggests, the development director is concerned with the growth of the organization. This includes staff, membership, budget, company assets, and all other company resources, to help make the best use of them and maximize the organization's profitability and profile.

See also
Agency cost
Chair (official)
Corporate governance
Corporate title

References

External links
 http://www.raise-funds.com/1999/a-development-director-needs-more-than-a-smile-and-a-shoeshine-but-its-a-good-start/

Management occupations
Corporate governance
Positions of authority
Non-profit executives